Hitachi Newton Aycliffe (also known as Newton Aycliffe Manufacturing Facility) is a railway rolling stock assembly plant owned by Hitachi Rail Europe, situated in Newton Aycliffe, County Durham, in the North East of England. Construction started in 2013 at a cost of £82 million, with train assembly commencing in 2015. It was the first factory that Hitachi built in Europe, as a result of it winning the Intercity Express Programme tender.
Originally on opening, no actual manufacturing operations took place at the site; it assembled components built elsewhere into completed trains. However, for the later classes, some manufacturing took place on site. By October 2017, the plant employed over 1,000 members of staff.

In December 2021, it was announced that the rolling stock for the HS2 line, would be a joint venture between Hitachi and Alstom.


History 

In 2007, the Department for Transport (DfT) in the United Kingdom decided to procure new trains to replace the InterCity 125 fleet and on 12 February 2009, the DfT announced that Agility Trains, a consortium led by Hitachi, had won the tender. In 2011 Hitachi chose the site of the UK factory at developer Merchant Place Developments' Amazon Park (later renamed Merchant Park mid-2013) site in Newton Aycliffe, County Durham, close to Heighington railway station and adjacent to the Tees Valley line. Hitachi announced its intention to proceed with construction of the facility in July 2012, after financial closure was achieved for the part of the train order for First Great Western. The contract for the construction of the £82 million  factory was awarded to Shepherd Group on 1 November 2013. Construction of the factory was scheduled to start in 2013, with train production beginning in 2015 and the plant reaching full production capacity in 2016. Erection of the frame of the factory was complete by June 2014, with an official topping out ceremony held in October 2014. The factory was officially opened on 3 September 2015, in the presence of Hiroaki Nakanishi (Hitachi), Patrick McLoughlin (MP), Claire Perry (MP), George Osborne (MP), David Cameron (Prime Minister of the United Kingdom) and 500 guests. It has created 420 jobs, and aims to employ more than 700 jobs at maximum capacity. It was reported that it received over 16,000 job applications, in an area where the Teesside Steelworks recently closed down with a loss of 3,000 jobs.

In January 2016 it was announced that Hitachi's successful tender for the Edinburgh to Glasgow Improvement Programme consisting of new Class 385s would be primarily assembled at Newton Aycliffe, and as part of FirstGroup's successful tender for the TransPennine Express franchise, it was announced in March 2016 that new Class 802 rolling stock would be assembled at Newton Aycliffe. It was stated by Hiroaki Nakanishi that a UK vote to leave the European Union would result in a scaling back of investment in Newton Aycliffe, a comment which was echoed by local Labour politician, and backer of Britain Stronger in Europe, Phil Wilson.

In March 2019, Lumo ordered five AT300 trains for its services on the East Coast Main Line. The five units were built at Newton Aycliffe and maintained by Hitachi for ten years as part of the £100 million deal. When this order was announced, Hitachi stated that the plant needed new orders especially after it had lost out on the New Tube for London contract with London Underground to rival firm Siemens. The company said that it would be bidding for a proposed bi-mode fleet for the East Midlands franchise and the replacement trains for the Nexus contract on the Tyne and Wear Metro.

In July 2019, it was confirmed that Hitachi would build a fleet of 165 vehicles for East Midlands Railway. These would be marshalled into five car trains and be of a bi-mode design with four diesel engines per five car train. The project was listed as being worth £400 million.

In late 2019, a new order for 23 units from the A-Train family was announced for the Avanti West Coast franchise. The order, nominally worth over £350 million, is for 13 five car bi-mode units, and 10 seven car electric trains. The new units are intended to replace the 20 strong fleet of Class 221 Super Voyager stock used on the West Coast franchise.

In 2020, the plant employed 700 people, and was engaged in assembling/building the Classes 803, 805, 807 and 810. These train orders will see the factory in business until 2023, when the final unit is due to be delivered. However, in December 2021, it was announced that a joint venture between Hitachi and Alstom had won the contract to build 54 trains for the High Speed 2 programme. The rolling stock would be constructed at the Hitachi plant and Alstom plants in Crewe and Derby.

Site 
The factory covers over 31.5 acres of land with a building footprint of 475,000 sq ft (44,000 m2). It can assemble a maximum of 35 vehicles a month. The site is situated close to where George Stephenson assembled Locomotion No. 1, the first locomotive to carry passengers on a public rail line.

Classes
The following classes have been assembled at the plant;
Class 385
Class 800
Class 801
Class 802
Class 803
Class 805
Class 807
Class 810
Milan Metro Line 4 EMUs, final fitout only

Notes

References

External links

Buildings and structures completed in 2015
Economy of County Durham
Manufacturing plants in England
Rail transport in County Durham
Railway workshops in Great Britain
2015 establishments in England